Zambolist "Zam" Fredrick Sr. (born August 17, 1959) is a retired American professional basketball player. He spent his professional career playing in Italy, from 1981 to 1987, after graduating college from the University of South Carolina, in 1981. Although Fredrick played in Europe, he is best known in the United States for leading NCAA Division I in scoring, as a senior, in 1980–81, with a 28.9 points per game average.

College career
Fredrick grew up in South Carolina. He played college basketball at South Carolina (UofSC), under head coaches Frank McGuire and Bill Foster, between 1977 and 1981. The 781 total points he scored during his senior season is second all-time in school history, to Grady Wallace's 906, who, coincidentally, also led the nation in scoring in 1956–57.

Professional playing career
Despite being selected by the Los Angeles Lakers, in the 1981 NBA Draft (third round, 51st overall), Fredrick never played in the NBA. he was the Italian League Top Scorer in 1982, and the FIBA Saporta Cup Finals Top Scorer, in 1986.

Coaching career
After his decade-long professional career in Europe, Fredrick came back to the US, and coached high school basketball at Calhoun County High School (CCHS), in St. Matthews, South Carolina. During one seven-year stretch, Fredrick led CCHS to five state championships, and a winning streak of 81 games. His son, Zam Fredrick, Jr., was a member of three of those. His son also scored a South Carolina state record 3,481 points, and had played on the varsity team since 8th grade. Fredrick, Sr. is still a coach at CCHS to this day.

See also
List of NCAA Division I men's basketball season scoring leaders

References

External links
Italian League Profile 
College statistics at the Draft Review

1959 births
Living people
American expatriate basketball people in Italy
Basketball players from South Carolina
High school basketball coaches in South Carolina
Lega Basket Serie A players
Los Angeles Lakers draft picks
People from St. Matthews, South Carolina
South Carolina Gamecocks men's basketball players
Victoria Libertas Pallacanestro players
Virtus Bologna players
American men's basketball players
Shooting guards